Chenjiaqiao  is a station on Line 1 of Chongqing Rail Transit located in Shapingba District, Chongqing Municipality, China. It opened in 2012.

Station structure

References 

Railway stations in China opened in 2012
Chongqing Rail Transit stations